Yaffa Ben-Ari is an Israeli diplomat who served as an Israeli Ambassador to Japan from November 2017 to October 2021. Before that, she was Deputy Director-General of the Ministry of Foreign Affairs as Head of the Economic Affairs Division. Ben-Ari was also Ambassador to Serbia and Montenegro and non-resident Ambassador to the Republic of Macedonia as well as Consulate General in San Francisco, California.

She graduated from Tel Aviv University with a degree in political science, received an M.A. degree (with distinction) from the University of Haifa and an Executive M.B.A. degree from Bar-Ilan University.

References

External links 
 

Israeli women ambassadors
Ambassadors of Israel to Japan
Israeli consuls
Ambassadors of Israel to Serbia
Ambassadors of Israel to Serbia and Montenegro
Ambassadors of Israel to North Macedonia
Tel Aviv University alumni
University of Haifa alumni
Bar-Ilan University alumni
Year of birth missing (living people)
Living people